Harold Francis Alexander (21 April 1902 – 17 August 1964) was an Australian rules footballer who played with South Melbourne in the Victorian Football League (VFL).

Notes

External links 

1902 births
1964 deaths
Australian rules footballers from Victoria (Australia)
Sydney Swans players
Leopold Football Club (MJFA) players